Chez moi is a studio album by French singer/songwriter Serge Lama, released in 1974 on Philips Records.

Background 
Chez moi was a follow-up to Serge Lama's very successful 1973 album Je suis malade, which sold 110,000 copies in only 15 days.

Commercial performance 
The album reached number one in France (according to the data compiled by Centre d'information et de documentation du disque).

Track listing

References

External links 
 Serge Lama – Chez moi at Discogs
 Serge Lama – Chez moi on Ultratop.be
 Videos from the INA archive
 

1974 albums
Serge Lama albums
Philips Records albums